Burqin County is a county in Xinjiang, China and is under the administration of the Kazakh autonomous area of Altay Prefecture. The postcode is 836600.

Administrative divisions 
 Town (镇 / بازارلىق / قالاشىع)
 Burqin Town (布尔津镇 / بۇرچىن بازىرى / بۋىرشىن قالاشىعى)
 Oymak Town (窝依莫克镇 / ئويماق بازىرى)
 Chonghur Town (冲乎尔镇 / چوڭقۇر بازىرى)
 Kostik Town (阔斯特克镇 / قوستىق بازىرى)
 Township (乡 / يېزا / اۋىل)
 Burqin Township (布尔津乡)
 Dulaiti Township (杜来提乡 / دۇۋلايتى يېزىسى)
 Egiztobe Township (也格孜托别乡 / ئېگىزتۆپە يېزىسى)
 Ethnic Township (民族乡)
 Kom-Kanas Mongolian Ethnic Township (Hemuhanasi Mongol Township; 禾木哈纳斯蒙古族乡 / قومقاناس موڭعۇل ۇلتتىق اۋىلى / قۇمقاناس موڭغۇل ئاپتونوم يېزىسى)

Demographics

Geography
Burqin County is located in the northernmost part of Xinjiang. Its county seat, which is called Burqin Town is situated at the confluence of the Irtysh and its right tributary, the Burqin River. Most of the county is within the Burqin River basin, which reaches into the Altai Mountains on Xinjiang's border with Mongolia and Russia. The major mountain massif on Burqin county's border with these two countries is Tavan Bogd.

The Kanas Lake is located in the northern part of the county, on the border with the Habahe County.

It has a 94m high concrete arch dam; the dam's hydroelectric plant  generates 220 Megawatt of power. The construction work started in July 2009, with an expected completion date of June 2013; construction was completed in 2014 and the dam started generating power in November 2015.

Farther upstream on the Burqin, the Burqin Chonghu'er Dam operates in the town of Chunkur, at 
.

Climate

Transport 
 China National Highway 217
Burqin Kanas Airport

Notes

County-level divisions of Xinjiang
Altay Prefecture